Los Bunkers (Spanish for The Bunkers) is an alternative rock band from Concepción, Chile, formed in 1999 by brothers Álvaro and Gonzalo López, Mauricio Basualto, and brothers Francisco and Mauricio Durán.

They are well known in their country for their contemporary sounds of rock, based on sounds of the 1960s, from bands like The Beatles, and also including sounds from their folk roots. The band name is essentially a play on words that at the simplest level recalls Chilean rock groups of the 1960s like Los Jokers and Los Sonnys. The use of the letter B and K was also considered to be desirable by the band as it aligned themselves with some of their biggest music idols such as The Beatles and The Kinks. Finally the word Bunkers is also symbolic of the refuge that the band and music had become against all that surrounded them

History
United initially by their common love for The Beatles, Los Bunkers have shown over the years a growing interest in the composition of Chilean folk roots, especially those working during the 1960s movement of the New Chilean Song. Between these two related creative influences, the band creates music associated with classic rock but with a new freshness, plus an exceptional flexibility that has allowed them to maintain a healthy pace of new albums.

Los Bunkers is one of the three Chilean groups to appear at the Festival Lollapalooza Chicago 2011. They also appeared in Lollapalooza Santiago the same year.

Members 
 Current members
Álvaro López - vocals, rhythm guitar, percussion
Francisco Durán - vocals, keyboards, synthesizers, rhythm guitar
Mauricio Durán - lead guitar, keyboards, synthesizers, backing vocals
Gonzalo López - bass, backing vocals
Mauricio Basualto - drums, percussion

 Former members
Manuel Lagos - drums (1999–2001)

Discography

Studio albums/EPs 
 Jamás (Spanish for Never) (EP) (2000; self-released)
 Los Bunkers (Spanish for The Bunkers) (April 3, 2001; Big Sur Records)
 Canción de Lejos (Spanish for Song From Afar) (June 6, 2002; Big Sur Records)
 La Culpa (Spanish for The Guilt) (October 3, 2003; Sony Music)
 Vida de Perros (Spanish for Dog's Life) (September 8, 2005; Sony Music)
 Barrio Estación (Spanish for Station Neighborhood) (June 10, 2008; Universal Music)
 Música Libre (Spanish for Free Music) (November 12, 2010; Universal Music)
 La velocidad de la luz (Spanish for The speed of light) (May 14, 2013; Evolución Records)

Compilations 
 Singles 2001-2006 (CD/DVD) (October 2007; Sony Music)

Live albums/DVDs 
 En Vivo (November 16, 2006; La Oreja Records)
 Los Bunkers, Live in Concert (April 24, 2007; La Oreja Records)

Singles

References

 News of Los Bunkers

Chilean alternative rock groups
Folk rock groups
Musical groups established in 1999
Rock en Español music groups
1999 establishments in Chile